Acantharctia latifasciata is a moth of the family Erebidae. It was described by George Hampson in 1909. It is found in South Africa.

References

Endemic moths of South Africa
Moths described in 1909
Spilosomina
Moths of Africa